Gweda, or Garuwahi, is an Austronesian language of the eastern Papua New Guinean mainland. As of 2001, it was spoken by three generations of a single family.

References

Definitely endangered languages
Nuclear Papuan Tip languages
Languages of Milne Bay Province